Chute-Saint-Philippe Aerodrome  is located on the shore of Lac Marquis, Quebec, Canada.

References

External links
Page about this airport on COPA's Places to Fly airport directory

Registered aerodromes in Laurentides